Aponogeton undulatus is a species of aquatic plant, sometimes used in aquariums.  Some taxonomists consider this should be under the name Aponogeton stachyosporus.

Origin

It is originally from India, Bangladesh, Myanmar, and Sri Lanka.

Description

It is a submerged aquatic plant with an ovoid rhizome about 2 inches (5 cm) long by 1 inch (2.5 cm) broad. The leaves are a very pale green, 4 to 6 inches (10 to 15 cm) long with an undulating margin on petioles of 6 inches (15 cm) length. Floating leaves are not produced by the true species but some hybrids do produce them. The flowers are produced on a single erect stem with white flowers.

Cultivation and uses

Many hybrids of this species are sold in the aquarium trade.
It will tolerate most water conditions. It likes a bright position but will grow in partial shade. 
It is a popular specimen plant for aquariums. 
Some plants will go dormant in the winter and for several months can be kept at a lower temperature, others seem to keep growing.

A fine brush can be used to pollinate the flowers. Seeds will germinate in a sand/very fine gravel compost covered by shallow water.

References

undulatus
Aquatic plants
Freshwater plants